The men's large hill individual competition of the Beijing 2022 Olympics was held on 11 and 12 February, at the Snow Ruyi hill in Zhangjiakou. Marius Lindvik of Norway won the event, which became his first Olympic medal. Ryōyū Kobayashi of Japan became the silver medalist, and Karl Geiger of Germany won the bronze medal, his first individual Olympic medal.

The defending champion was Kamil Stoch. The 2018 silver medalist, Andreas Wellinger, did not qualify for the Olympics, but the bronze medalist, Robert Johansson, did. Stefan Kraft was the 2021 World champion. Johansson and Geiger are the silver and bronze medalists, respectively. Geiger was leading the 2021–22 FIS Ski Jumping World Cup at the start of the Olympics, followed by Kobayashi, Halvor Egner Granerud, and Lindvik.

Kobayashi was leading after the first jump, with Lindvik second, and Timi Zajc third. Zajc had a mediocre second jump, and Geiger, who was sixth, advanced to the bronze medal position. Lindvik's second jump was sufficient to overtake Kobayashi for gold.

Schedule

Official training

Qualifying

Competition

Qualification

Results

Qualifying

Final

References

Ski jumping at the 2022 Winter Olympics
Men's events at the 2022 Winter Olympics